Dan Lin (born April 8, 1973) is a Taiwanese-American film producer. He is the founder and CEO of Rideback (formerly Lin Pictures until 2018), a film and television production company that he formed in 2008 that has a first-look deal at Universal Pictures. Lin produced Warner Bros.' Sherlock Holmes, Sherlock Holmes: A Game of Shadows, The Lego Movie, The Lego Batman Movie, The Lego Ninjago Movie, The Lego Movie 2: The Second Part, and the horror film It, which holds the record for highest-grossing horror film. Lin also produced Disney's Aladdin, a live action adaptation of the 1992 animated feature.

Early life
Dan Lin was born in Taipei, Taiwan, the son of an executive in the international food industry. He moved to the United States at the age of five.

In 1994, Lin received his undergraduate degree from the Wharton School of the University of Pennsylvania, and in 1999, he earned an M.B.A. from Harvard Business School.

Career
Between his first and second year at Harvard Business School, Lin undertook a summer internship program with Lorenzo di Bonaventura, who was then an executive with Warner Bros. Pictures. In 1999, a day after Lin's graduation, the studio executive offered Lin a junior position at Warners. Lin worked his way up to Senior Vice President of Production and left in 2007 to form his own company. During his eight years at Warners, Lin oversaw the development and production of the Academy Award-winning film The Departed, directed by Martin Scorsese. Other films Lin oversaw include 10,000 BC, directed by Roland Emmerich; The Aviator, directed by Martin Scorsese; Alexander, directed by Oliver Stone; TMNT; The Invasion; Unaccompanied Minors; Matchstick Men; Scooby-Doo 2: Monsters Unleashed; and Torque.

In January 2008 he formed Lin Pictures, based at Warner Bros. He described the transition from development executive to producer as natural: "It’s a symbiotic relationship between the studio and the producers, we all work together towards the same goal – make the best movie possible."

Lin currently serves on the board of directors for the Coalition of Asian Pacifics in Entertainment and is a mentor for both the Producers Guild of America and the Center for Asian American Media. In September 2008, Lin was honored as one of Variety's "10 Producers to Watch." In April 2015, Lin was named to The Hollywood Reporter'''s list of 'The 30 Most Powerful Film Producers in Hollywood'

In August 2022, The Hollywood Reporter reported that he is in talks to take over DC Films and Television Superhero Arm. This has yet to be announced or revealed by Warner Bros. officially. In September 2022, he ended negotiations and parted ways with Warner Bros. Discovery.

FilmographyHe was producer for all films unless otherwise noted.''

Film

Television

References

External links

Living people
1973 births
American film producers
Businesspeople from Los Angeles
Businesspeople from Taipei
Harvard Business School alumni
Wharton School of the University of Pennsylvania alumni
Film producers from California
Taiwanese expatriates in Hong Kong
Taiwanese emigrants to the United States
American people of Chinese descent